XER (1932–1933), licensed to Villa Acuña, Coahuila, Mexico, was John R. Brinkley's first high-powered "border-blaster" radio station. It first came on the air in 1932. It was shut down by the Mexican authorities in 1933 and the Villa Acuña Broadcasting Company was dissolved.

History of XER
XER called itself the "Sunshine Station between the Nations", and it broadcast on 735 kHz, on the AM band from Villa Acuña, Coahuila. The owner was Dr. John R. Brinkley of Kansas, who established a management company called Villa Acuña Broadcasting Company located just across the Rio Grande in Del Rio, Texas. It first signed on August 18, 1932, with a 50-kW transmitter and claimed 75 kW power output via an omnidirectional antenna. The engineering was by Will Branch of Fort Worth, who had engineered WBAP for Amon Carter, owner of the Fort Worth Star-Telegram. For a brief period, XER-AM was licensed for one million watts, but XER was shut down by the Mexican authorities on February 24, 1933, and the Villa Acuña Broadcasting Company of Del Rio, which had managed the station, was dissolved.

The XER call sign was assigned in 1943 to a new station in Linares, Nuevo León, which migrated to FM and is now XHR-FM.

See also
XERA - after XER closed down in 1933, XERA reoccupied the station's original facilities in September 1935.
XERF - a later station which began broadcasting shortly after XERA was closed down

References

External links
 "XER - The King of the Border Blasters" by John Schneider, 2015 (theradiohistorian.org)

Further reading
Wolfman Jack's old station howling once again. - Dallas Times Herald, January 2, 1983. - primarily about XERF but it also includes background information on the border-blasters.
Border Radio by Fowler, Gene and Crawford, Bill.  Texas Monthly Press, Austin. 1987 
Mass Media Moments in the United Kingdom, the USSR and the US, by Gilder, Eric. - "Lucian Blaga" University of Sibiu Press, Romania. 2003 

Mass media in Ciudad Acuña
Radio stations established in 1932
Radio stations disestablished in 1933
Defunct radio stations in Mexico
1932 establishments in Mexico
1933 disestablishments in Mexico